Russian Bureau of Philately (RBF) was a special organisation under the People's Commissariat for Posts and Telegraphs of the RSFSR in 1921–1924. This was the first Soviet government agency in charge of all matters of the organisation and development of philately.

History 
Soon after the Russian Civil War, Soviet governmental institutions were set up to conduct the activities and practices in the field of philately. In 1921, the People's Commissariat for Posts and Telegraphs of the RSFSR (Narkompochtel) founded a special organ, the Russian Bureau of Philately (RBF). It was aimed at dealing with all questions regarding the organisation and development of philately in Soviet Russia.

In 1921, a Narkompochtel representative Feodor Chuchin worked within the RBF and proposed change in the philatelic policy. According to this proposal, the monopoly on foreign trade should have been extended and included the traffic in postage stamps, the revenue being used to aid street children. In 1922, Chuchin was appointed to head the Organisation of the Commissioner for Philately and Scripophily.

In 1922, the Russian Bureau of Philately at the RSFSR People's Commissariat for Posts and Telegraphs supported an idea of establishing a new philatelic society, All-Russian Society of Philatelists.

At some point, the RBF aided in issuing stamps of Soviet Russia and the Ukrainian Soviet Socialist Republic.

In 1924, the RBF was closed and its functions were transferred to the Organisation of the Commissioner for Philately and Scripophily.

See also 
 All-Russian Society of Philatelists
 First All-Union Philatelic Exhibition
 Leniniana (philately)
 Moscow Society of Philatelists and Collectors
 Organisation of the Commissioner for Philately and Scripophily
 People's Commissariat for Posts and Telegraphs of the RSFSR
 Philatelic International
 Soviet Philatelic Association
 Soviet Philatelist

References 

Philately of the Soviet Union
1921 establishments in Russia
1924 disestablishments
1920s disestablishments in the Soviet Union
Government agencies of Russia
Philatelic organizations
Defunct organizations based in Russia